Charalambos Kyriakides (born 30 November 1998) is a Cypriot footballer who plays as a goalkeeper for Omonia.

Honours
Omonia
Cypriot First Division: 2020–21
Cypriot Cup: 2021–22
Cypriot Super Cup: 2021

References

External links

1998 births
Living people
Cypriot footballers
Cyprus international footballers
Association football goalkeepers
AC Omonia players